Yuba Pass is a mountain pass on State Route 49 in Sierra County in the U.S. state of California. The pass lies at an elevation of  about 3.4 air miles west of Sattley, on the divide between the North Yuba River and the Middle Fork Feather River (Sierra Valley). Thus, unlike most of the well-known Sierra Nevada passes, including the much lower Beckwourth Pass on the east edge of the Sierra Valley, Yuba Pass does not lie on the Great Basin Divide.

This Yuba Pass should not be confused with Yuba Gap, a minor mountain pass along Interstate 80 on the Nevada-Placer county line.

History

Gallery

See also 
 List of mountain passes in California

References 

Mountain passes of California
Landforms of Sierra County, California
Mountain passes of the Sierra Nevada (United States)